Y? was an educational children's science program shown on the Nine Network in Australia. It was produced by Southern Star Endemol between 1999 and 2002. Each episode ran for 22 minutes. A total of five seasons were recorded. Each season was 65 episodes long.

Season 1 was hosted by Joanne Nova with Alanna Edwards and seasons 2 to 5 were hosted by Tara Colegrave and 'science host' David Lampard. The show featured in-studio science experiments. In season 1 these were presented by Nova but in later seasons these were presented by Lampard (and occasionally by Colegrave). The program was interspersed with external segments where other presenters go to forests, factories, etc. and explain practical science phenomena, usually based upon questions sent in by viewers.

The presenters included Brad Hills, Kristy Mollica, Joseph May, Lisa Barry and Taryn Onafaro.

The show was in many ways similar to The Curiosity Show, which ran many years earlier. However, the hosts of Y? were charismatic younger adults, compared with the older academic Prof. Rob Morrison and Dr. Deane Hutton who hosted the earlier counterpart, making Y? inherently more appealing to children.

Y? did not labour to "dumb down" the science content of its experiments and explanations, aiming its explanations at a late-primary school audience with above average intelligence. It endeavoured to respond to questions sent in by children, such as "How do radio stations broadcast to all our radios in our cars or in our houses?" and "Where do flies go at night?"

References

External links
 

Science education television series
Australian children's education television series
Nine Network original programming
1999 Australian television series debuts
2002 Australian television series endings
Television series by Endemol Australia
Television series by Endemol